The Heinkel P.1080 was a German Emergency Fighter proposed by Heinkel.

Design and Development 
Work on the P.1080 began in early 1945 when the Ministry of Aviation issued specifications for a fighter powered by two ramjets. The aircraft would have been tailless, with the elevators built in to the swept wing, which was based on that of the Heinkel P.1078, and would have had a single vertical stabilizer. The cockpit was located far forward in the fuselage, and the two engines were mounted at the wing roots. The nose would have housed a radar and two 30 mm MK 108 cannon. For takeoff, the aircraft would have been fitted with solid-fuel RATO boosters and jettisonable undercarriage. Landing would have been accomplished with a retractable skid. No prototypes were built.

Specifications (Heinkel P.1080, as designed)

See also

References 

P1080